The Dawns Here Are Quiet (Зори здесь тихие) is a 1973 Russian-language opera by Kirill Molchanov based on the novel by Boris Vasilyev. The opera was performed at the Mariinsky Theatre in February 2015.

References

1973 operas
Russian-language operas
Operas based on novels
Operas set in Russia
World War II in popular culture
Operas